Luz Robles Escamilla is the Senator for the Utah State Senate's 10th District. Prior to redistricting she represented the 1st District, defeating Republican Carlton Christensen for the seat November 4, 2008 after having beaten incumbent Sen. Fred Fife for the party nomination earlier that year.

Early life, education, and career
The daughter of two Mexican college professors, Escamilla was born in 1978 and raised in Mexico. After moving to the United States in 1996, Escamilla graduated from Marian Catholic High School in San Diego, CA. She then earned her Bachelor of Science at the University of Utah in business marketing in 2000. She also holds a Masters in Public Administration, which she earned from the University of Utah in 2005. Luz is married to former Arizona lawmaker Juan Carlos Escamilla. He proposed to Luz on the Utah Senate floor during the 2014 legislative session.

Luz Escamilla is a director for the Zions Bank Business Resource Center. She is a member of the Church of Jesus Christ of Latter-day Saints, who are often referred to as Mormons.

Political career
Senator Escamilla serves as the minority assistant whip in the Utah State Senate. Governor Jon Huntsman Jr. appointed Escamilla to the State Office of Ethnic Affairs in 2005. In 2010, she received the Salt Lake Chamber of Commerce Pathfinder Award  and the SBA Award. She has also received the Pete Suazo Memorial Award from the University of Utah. Senator Escamilla has also served as a board member for the University of Utah College of Social and Behavioral Sciences, the Regence Caring Foundation, the Utah Health Policy Project, and the Primary Children's Medical Center.
Escamilla was first elected to the Utah State Senate in 2008, and was re-elected in 2012. In 2016, Escamilla served on the Executive Appropriations Committee and the Social Services Appropriations Subcommittee. [4] She also served on the following Senate standing committees: 
 Senate Ethics Committee
 Senate Government Operations and Political Subdivisions Committee
 Senate Health and Human Services Committee
 Senate Judiciary, Law Enforcement, and Criminal Justice Committee.

In 2014, Escamilla ran for Congress in Utah's 2nd congressional district. The seat was held by Republican incumbent Chris Stewart, who won reelection.

In 2019, Sen. Escamilla ran for mayor of Salt Lake City, after Mayor Jackie Biskupski announced she would not run for another term. In the 2019 election, Escamilla lost, finishing second behind Salt Lake City Councilwoman Erin Mendenhall. She conceded the loss on November 6, 2019, one day after the race, after initial hesitation to concede in the event that mail-in ballots could affect results in the run-off election

2012 Utah State Senate election

Legislation

2016 sponsored bills

Notable legislation
During the 2011 Legislative Session, Escamilla pioneered groundbreaking immigration reform legislation, SB60, which would issue illegal immigrants already living in Utah an "accountability card," giving them the right to work without changing their legal status. Immigrants would have to pass a criminal background check and learn English to obtain the permit. Immigration experts have hailed Escamilla's immigration bill and Escamilla herself as "ground breaking" and "creative." While her SB60 did not pass, it was a model for a guest worker program that ultimately did pass the 2011 Legislature.

Escamilla has also proposed a bill that would protect the rights of fathers against fraudulent adoption practices. SB 63 would have allowed a compact of states to share punitive father's records. This would help protect father's rights if mothers took their children out of the state without the father's knowledge. The bill was not voted on the floor before Utah's 45-day session was completed.

Escamilla introduced a bill to fund the Utah Department of Environmental Quality to install air and water monitors at the site of the proposed Utah Inland Port, to establish baseline readings for future comparison. An environmental impact study of the proposed port has not been completed.

External links
Utah State Legislature – Senator Luz Robles Escamilla official government website
Project Vote Smart – Senator Luz Robles (UT) profile
Follow the Money – Luz Robles
2008 campaign contributions

Sources

1978 births
21st-century American politicians
21st-century American women politicians
American politicians of Mexican descent
Hispanic and Latino American state legislators
Hispanic and Latino American women in politics
Latter Day Saints from Utah
Living people
Mexican emigrants to the United States
Politicians from Salt Lake City
University of Utah alumni
Democratic Party Utah state senators
Women state legislators in Utah